The Statue of the Nile God is an Ancient Roman, likely Hellenistic, marble statue dating from the 2nd to 3rd century AD.

It is located at Piazzetta Nilo, at the start of via Nilo, in the quarter of the same name, and it is this statue that gives all their name. The church of Santa Maria Assunta dei Pignatelli faces the statue, and the Palazzo Panormita is on the north flank. Two blocks east, along Via Benedetto Croce (part of the Decumano Inferiore commonly called Spaccanapoli) rises the church of San Domenico.

History

The statue represents the God of the Nile, recumbent with a cornucopia and lying on a sphinx. The statue was probably erected in the then Roman port city by Alexandrian merchants. It was recovered, headless, in 1476, and was nicknamed "Corpo di Napoli". It was placed upon a pedestal in 1657, and later that century a bearded head was sculpted. In recent decades, the statue was again decapitated by robbers, and later recovered.

A higher quality version of the same topic, also Ancient Roman, is found in the Vatican Museums. Both statues are copies of an original from Alexandria, Egypt.

Gallery

References

Monuments and memorials in Naples
Roman sites of Campania
Hellenistic sculpture
Nude sculptures